MNG Airlines is a Turkish cargo airline headquartered in Istanbul based at Istanbul Airport.

History
The airline was established by Mehmet Nazif Günal in 1997 and started operations on 30 November 1997. Transatlantic services began in 1998 with a flight from Frankfurt to Toronto, followed by scheduled services to the USA on 8 November 1998. In mid-2002 passenger operations were added. In 2005 MNG won an award from Airbus for 100% reliability on the 30-year-old Airbus A300. On February 6, 2006 MNG ceased all passenger flights. Only cargo flights are being continued. In 2008, MNG Airlines acquired Slovenian cargo company Solinair. 

In 2020, MNG began the operation of its twice-weekly freighter service linking Cologne Bonn Airport (CGN) in Germany and John F. Kennedy International (JFK) in New York. The new flight is an expansion of the carrier's routes flown from CGN, which include flights to Istanbul Atatürk Airport (ISL) on behalf of Air France, and Tel Aviv Ben Gurion Airport (TLV) for its own operations.

Destinations 

MNG Airlines operates scheduled and charter services within the Middle East and to the Far East, United States and European destinations. It operated scheduled freighter services to the following destinations as of July 2013:

Africa
 Algeria
 Algiers - Houari Boumediene Airport
 Oran - Ahmed Ben Bella Airport
 Libya
 Tripoli – Mitiga International Airport
 Tunisia
 Tunis - Tunis–Carthage International Airport

Asia
 Bahrain
 Manama – Bahrain International Airport
 Iraq
 Baghdad - Baghdad International Airport
 Israel
 Tel Aviv – Ben Gurion Airport
 Pakistan
 Karachi - Jinnah International Airport
 Lahore - Allama Iqbal International Airport
 Qatar
 Doha - Hamad International Airport
 United Arab Emirates
 Abu Dhabi - Abu Dhabi International Airport
 Dubai - Al Maktoum International Airport

Europe
 Croatia
 Zagreb – Zagreb Airport
 France
 Paris – Charles de Gaulle Airport
 Germany
 Cologne – Cologne/Bonn Airport
 Leipzig – Leipzig/Halle Airport
 Munich – Munich Airport
 Netherlands
 Amsterdam – Amsterdam Airport Schiphol
 Turkey
 Istanbul – Istanbul Airport (Hub)
 United Kingdom
 London – London Luton Airport
 Birmingham – Birmingham Airport

North America
 United States
 New York City - John F. Kennedy International Airport

Fleet
As of October 2021, the MNG Airlines fleet comprises the following aircraft:

References

External links

Official website

Turkish brands
Airlines established in 1997
Airlines of Turkey
Cargo airlines of Turkey